Garikapati Varalakshmi (27 September 1926 – 26 November 2006) was an Indian actress, stage artist, singer, and director who worked in Telugu and Tamil films.

Biography 
Varalakshmi was born in 1926 in Ongole, Andhra Pradesh, India to a Telugu Kapu family. She left home to act on stage in Vijayawada when she was 11 years old. She acted along with stage actors  Thungala Chalapathi and Dasari Kotiratnam and became popular for her roles in plays like Sakkubai and Rangoon Rowdy.

Her first two movie roles aged 14  were in Barrister Parvatheesam, produced by Raghupathy Prakash, and Bondam Pelli, produced by H. M. Reddy. These two movies were released together as a two-in-one movie. She then moved to Bombay to sing in the chorus for Naushad in 1942. As her career as a singer was not successful, she returned to Madras in 1946. She married the filmmaker and studio-owner K. S. Prakash Rao. Her husband and she acted in and produced a controversial and popular movie, Drohi in which she played the part of an arrogant daughter.

Drohi  was followed by popular movies like Kula Gotralu, Kanna Talli and Pelli Chesi Choodu in which she acted with all the top heroes of Indian films  of the  1940s and 1950s in Telugu and Tamil, playing roles ranging from the loving woman and arrogant sister to the mother-in-law. She also directed a social movie, Moogajeevulu. She got involved in politics and supported M.G.R for a short time and was an active member of Andhra Pradesh Praja Natya Mandali. She was the mother of two children, one daughter Kovelamudi Kanaka Durga and a son Kovelamudi Siva Prakash who became a famous cameraman. She is also the step-mother of the famous director Kovelamudi Raghavendra Rao.

Filmography
Note: The list is not comprehensive.

Actress

 Barrister Parvateesam (1940)
 Bondam Pelli (1940)
 Dakshayagnam (1941)
 Bhakta Prahlada (1942)
 Vindhyarani (1948)
 Drohi (1948)
 Maya Rambha (1950)
 Modati Rathri (1950)
 Sri Lakshmamma Katha (1950)
 Swapna Sundari (1950)
 Deeksha (1951)
 Nirdoshi (1951)
 Niraparadhi (1951)
 Manavathi (1952)
 Pelli Chesi Choodu (1952)
 Kanna Talli (1953)
 Naa Chellelu (1953)
 Paropakaram (1953)
 Jyoti (1954)
 Maa Gopi (1954)
 Menarikam (1954)
 Gulebakavali (1955)
 Ante Kavali (1955)
 Melukolupu (1956)
 Paasavalai (1956)
 Naan Petra Selvam (1956)
 Dongallo Dora (1957)
 Aaravalli (1957)
 Karpurakarasi (1957)
 Pathini Deivam (1957)
 Raja Nandini (1958)
Sampoorna Ramayanam (1958)
Dongalunnaru Jagratha (1958)
 Mangalya Balam (1958)
 Sri renuka devi mahatyam (1960)
 Sivagami (1960)
 Iddaru Mitrulu (1961)
 Kula Gothralu (1962)
 Bhishma (1962)
Sumangali (1965)
 Antastulu (1965)
Veerabhimanyu (1965)
 Kuzhandaiyum Deivamum (1965)
Aata Bommalu (1966)
 Aastiparulu (1966)
 Letha Manasulu (1966)
 Bangaru Pichika (1967)
Rahasyam (1967)
Amayakudu (1968)
 Bangaru Sankelu (1968) 
 Buddhimanthudu (1969)
 Nindu Hrudayalu (1969)
Pavitra Bandham (1971)
 Vazhaiyadi Vazhai(1972)
 Samsaram Sagaram (1973)
Doctor Babu (1973)
 Ganga Manga (1973)
Chakravakam (1974)
 Athavarillu (1976)
 Sri Rajeswari Vilas Coffee Club (1976)
Mahatmudu (1976)
 Gorantha Deepam (1978)
Sirimalle Navvindi (1980)
Kiladi Krishnudu (1980)

Director
 Moogajeevulu (1968)

References

External links
 
 Maverick Varalakshmi

1926 births
2006 deaths
Indian women playback singers
Indian film actresses
Telugu actresses
Telugu playback singers
Singers from Andhra Pradesh
20th-century Indian singers
People from Ongole
Telugu film directors
Indian women film directors
20th-century Indian film directors
Film directors from Andhra Pradesh
20th-century Indian actresses
20th-century Indian women singers
Film musicians from Andhra Pradesh
Women musicians from Andhra Pradesh